The Stevens House is a historic house located at 140 East Main Street in Tiskilwa, Illinois.

History 
John Stevens, a wealthy local businessman, built the house in 1842. The original house had a Greek Revival design highlighted by a full porch with columns. In 1910, the house was redesigned in the Classical Revival style, bringing it in line with contemporary trends. The house's new features included a new porch, a bay window with Classical columns, a dormer projecting from the front of the roof, and a frieze and cornice.

The house was added to the National Register of Historic Places on November 5, 1992.

References

Houses on the National Register of Historic Places in Illinois
Greek Revival architecture in Illinois
Neoclassical architecture in Illinois
Houses completed in 1842
National Register of Historic Places in Bureau County, Illinois